Nuuman Barau Danbatta is a Nigerian politician, a Civil Servant that rose to the position of Permanent Secretary of the Ministry of Transportation, Federal Republic of Nigeria, the former Chairman of Unity Bank plc, current chairman of Gracefield Island, and also holds a traditional title "Ajiyan Kazaure" Jigawa State.

Early life and education
Nu'uman  was born on 20 December 1955 in Kano Municipal Local Government Area of Kano State, he attended Kwalli Primary School, Kano and attended Rumfa College, Kano for his secondary school education. He holds a Degree in Political Science from Bayero University College Kano(now renamed Bayero University Kano).

References

1955 births
21st-century Nigerian politicians
Bayero University Kano alumni
Bayero University alumni
Bayero University people
Living people
Politicians from Kano
Politicians from Kano State
Rumfa College alumni